Albert V (24 May 1648 – 6 August 1699) was a duke of Saxe-Coburg.

He was the fifth but second surviving son of Ernst I, Duke of Saxe-Coburg-Altenburg (1601-1675), and Elisabeth Sophie of Saxe-Altenburg (1619-1680). He was born in Gotha. With his brother Bernhard, he attended the University of Tübingen from 1666, and later continued his studies in Geneva. He went on his Grand Tour with his brother Heinrich to Denmark, Sweden and the Netherlands. 

When his father died in 1675, Albert became ruler of the duchy of Saxe-Gotha-Altenburg along with all his brothers, and took Saalfeld as his residence. In 1680, after concluding a treaty of partition with his brothers, he received Coburg, to which he moved his residence.

After his death without surviving sons in Coburg, his lands were disputed between his brothers, but Coburg was finally inherited by his youngest surviving brother, John Ernst.

Family 
Albrecht married firstly in Gotha on 18 July 1676 Marie Elisabeth of Brunswick-Wolfenbüttel, Dowager Duchess of Saxe-Weimar. They had only one son:

 Ernest August (b. Saalfeld, 1 September 1677 – d. Saalfeld, 17 August 1678).

Secondly, Albrecht married in Coburg, on 24 May 1688 Susanne Elisabeth Kempinsky; in 1689, she was created Countess Kempinsky of Schwisitz and Altenhofen. They had no children.

Ancestors

References
August Beck, Albrecht, Herzog von Sachsen-Coburg. In: Allgemeine Deutsche Biographie  (ADB). vol I. Duncker & Humblot, Leipzig 1875, p. 318.

1648 births
1699 deaths
House of Wettin
People from Gotha (town)
Dukes of Saxe-Coburg